Farhan Shakor Tawfeeq (born 15 October 1995 in Kirkuk, Iraq) is an Iraqi footballer who plays as a striker for Amanat Baghdad in the Iraqi Premier League.

Player info
Farhan Shakor scored three goals in the knock out stages of the 2013 FIFA U-20 World Cup competition to help his side. His style is to trap back and initiate attacks and always seem to be at the right place at the right time. His brace against South Korea will be one to be remembered as he cunningly got those goals against the Asian champions. He was one of the best players in the tournament.

After the 2013 FIFA U-20 World Cup, Jordanian club Al-Faisaly team expressed their wish in Shakor's joining the team.

International debut
On September 4, 2014 Shakor made his International debut against Peru in a friendly match that ended 0–2 for Peru.

International goals

Iraq national under-20 team goals
Goals are correct excluding friendly matches and unrecognized tournaments such as Arab U-20 Championship.

Honours

International
Iraq Youth team
 2012 AFC U-19 Championship: runner-up
 2013 FIFA U-20 World Cup: 4th Place

References

External links
 
 

1995 births
Living people
People from Kirkuk
Iraqi footballers
Iraq international footballers
Association football forwards
Asian Games medalists in football
Footballers at the 2014 Asian Games
Asian Games bronze medalists for Iraq
Medalists at the 2014 Asian Games